Chalerm Prommas (19 August 1896 – 26 May 1975), also known by his former noble title as Luang Chaloem Khamphirawet, was a Thai medical doctor. He was a pioneering figure at Thailand's two oldest medical schools, Siriraj and Chulalongkorn, and went on to serve as the country's Minister of Public Health. He was also known for his academic work, most importantly the discovery, with Svasti Daengsvang, of the life cycle of the Gnathostoma spinigerum parasite, which causes gnathostomiasis in humans.

References

Chalerm Prommas
Chalerm Prommas
Chalerm Prommas
Chalerm Prommas
Chalerm Prommas
Chalerm Prommas
Chalerm Prommas
1896 births
1975 deaths
Chalerm Prommas